The R559 road is a regional road in Ireland which links various villages on Slea Head on the Dingle Peninsula with the town of Dingle and the N86 road. The road passes through a number of villages including Ventry, Coumeenoole, Dunquin and Dingle itself.

See also 

 Roads in Ireland
 National primary road
 National secondary road

References 

Regional roads in the Republic of Ireland
Roads in County Kerry